When a Woman Loves may refer to:
 When a Woman Loves (film), a 1950 film directed by Wolfgang Liebeneiner
 When a Woman Loves (album), released in 2000 by Patti LaBelle
 "When a Woman Loves" (song), released in 2010 by R. Kelly